Janus is the first studio album released by Boyfriend. The album was released physically on November 8 and online on November 13, 2012 by Starship Entertainment and their distributing label LOEN Entertainment.

Music videos
The music video for "Janus" was released on November 8, 2012. Their second music video was "I Yah" alongside child actress Kim So-hyun, was released on January 10, 2013

Commercial performance
Janus debuted at number two on the Gaon Album Chart in South Korea for the week of November 11, 2012. As of January 2013, the album has sold 32,205 copies in South Korea and 2,853 in Japan. Its reissue, I Yah, has sold 24,675 copies in South Korea and 3,670 in Japan as of 2013.

Track listing

Charts

Weekly charts

I Yah

Monthly charts

I Yah

Release history

References

External links

2012 albums
Boyfriend (band) albums
Kakao M albums
Korean-language albums
Starship Entertainment albums